Konrad Wilhelm von Wernau (1638–1684) was the Prince-Bishop of Würzburg from 1683 to 1684.

He was ordained as a priest on 21 December 1682. The cathedral chapter of Würzburg Cathedral elected him Prince-Bishop of Würzburg on 31 May 1683.

He died on 5 September 1684, without having had his election confirmed by the pope and without having been consecrated as a bishop.

References

External links

1638 births
1684 deaths
Prince-Bishops of Würzburg